Aurélien Nguiamba (born 18 January 1999) is a French professional footballer who plays as a midfielder for Ekstraklasa club Jagiellonia Białystok, on loan from Spezia.

Club career
Nguiamba joined the AS Nancy Lorraine youth academy in 2014, after being scouted in Colmar. He made his professional debut for Nancy in a 3–0 Ligue 1 loss to Le Havre on 24 April 2018.

International career
Nguiamba was born in France to a Cameroonian father, who is a professor of literature in France. He is a youth international for France, and represented France at the 2017 UEFA European Under-17 Championship.

References

External links
 
 
 
 
 

Living people
1999 births
Sportspeople from Colmar
Association football midfielders
French footballers
France youth international footballers
French sportspeople of Cameroonian descent
AS Nancy Lorraine players
Gazélec Ajaccio players
Spezia Calcio players
Jagiellonia Białystok players
Ligue 2 players
Championnat National players
Championnat National 3 players
Serie A players

Footballers from Alsace
French expatriate footballers
Expatriate footballers in Italy
French expatriate sportspeople in Italy
Expatriate footballers in Poland
French expatriate sportspeople in Poland